Aina Leonidivna Tymchuk (born on 21 November 1973 in Dnipro) is a Ukrainian politician who was Governor of Kharkiv Oblast from 27 November 2020 until 11 August 2021.

Biography
Tymchuk was born 21 November 1973 in Dnipropetrovsk (current Dnipro). In 2004 she graduated from the Dnipropetrovsk Regional Institute of Public Administration of the National Academy of Public Administration under the President of Ukraine with a degree in Public Administration, Master of Public Administration. 

From February 2004 to April 2010 Tymchuk worked as a civil servant in the Dnipropetrovsk Oblast regional administration. In August 2010 she moved to Kharkiv to work first (until November 2010) as an adviser to Kharkiv Mayor Hennadiy Kernes on organizational issues and then from November 2010 until March 2014 she was Kernes's Deputy Mayor and Manager of the Executive Committee of the Kharkiv City Council.

In March 2014 she moved back to the Dnipropetrovsk Oblast regional administration where she became first (March 2014 -  January 2018) Deputy Chief of Staff of the Dnipropetrovsk Regional State Administration and then from November 2020 Chief of Staff.

On 27 November 2020 Ukrainian President Volodymyr Zelensky appointed Tymchuk Governor of Kharkiv Oblast. On 11 August 2021 Zelensky dismissed Tymchuk from this post after she had tendered in her resignation.

References

1973 births
Living people
Politicians from Dnipro
Governors of Kharkiv Oblast
21st-century Ukrainian politicians
21st-century Ukrainian women politicians